Kenneth Gordon Faulkner (10 September 1923 – 2000) was an English footballer who played in the Football League for Birmingham City.

Faulkner was born in Smethwick, Staffordshire. Capped by England at schoolboy level, he had a successful trial with Birmingham City during the Second World War. Faulkner, a forward, played for Birmingham in the 1944–45 season of wartime competition, and also made guest appearances for Coventry City and Port Vale. He made his debut in the penultimate game of the 1946–47 Second Division season, playing at outside right in a 2–0 win at Millwall. The last game of that season proved to be his last for the club; he was released in the 1947 close season and joined Oldbury United.

References

1923 births
2000 deaths
Sportspeople from Smethwick
English footballers
England schools international footballers
Association football forwards
Birmingham City F.C. players
Coventry City F.C. wartime guest players
Port Vale F.C. wartime guest players
Oldbury United F.C. players
English Football League players